Rhuddlan, Ceredigion is a small village in the  community of Llanwenog, Ceredigion, Wales. Rhuddlan is represented in the Senedd by Elin Jones (Plaid Cymru) and is part of the Ceredigion constituency in the House of Commons.

References

See also
Rhuddlan - town in Denbighshire.

Villages in Ceredigion